Helvina is a genus of beetles in the family Cerambycidae, containing the following species:

 Helvina howdenorum Hovore & Giesbert, 1998
 Helvina lanuginosa (Bates, 1865)
 Helvina strandi (Breuning, 1942)
 Helvina uncinata Thomson, 1864

References

Agapanthiini